The City and County of Swansea is a principal area in south Wales.

The Cadw/ICOMOS Register of Parks and Gardens of Special Historic Interest in Wales was established in 2002 and given statutory status in 2022. It is administered by Cadw, the historic environment agency of the Welsh Government. Elizabeth Whittle described Cadw as having a "somewhat special and guiding role" in the preservation of historic parks and gardens, since they are "an integral part of Welsh archaeological and architectural heritage". The register includes just under 400 sites, ranging from gardens of private houses, to cemeteries and public parks. Parks and gardens are listed at one of three grades, matching the grading system used for listed buildings. Grade I is the highest grade, for sites of exceptional interest; Grade II*, the next highest, denotes parks and gardens of more than special interest; while Grade II denotes nationally important sites of special interest.

There are 14 registered parks and gardens in Swansea. Three are listed at Grade I, and eleven at Grade II.

Key

List of parks and gardens

|}

See also

 List of scheduled monuments in Swansea
 Grade I listed buildings in Swansea
 Grade II* listed buildings in Swansea

Notes

References

Bibliography

Swansea
Swansea